John P. Brennan ( – August 18, 1889) was the first American Catholic priest to declare bankruptcy.

Personal life
Brennan was born in Indiana but spent most of his childhood in Taunton, Massachusetts. He was ordained a priest at Grand Séminaire de Montréal in 1856. He was graduated from the College of the Holy Cross on July 6, 1859.

While in Foxborough his health declined to the point where he had to give up his priestly duties. He spent the last four years of his life at his mother's house on Washington Street in Taunton, bedridden with chronic rheumatism, where he died on August 18, 1889.

Ministry
His first assignment was in Roxbury before becoming the resident pastor of St. Mary's Church in Dedham, Massachusetts. Brennan took over for his uncle, the founding pastor, Patrick O'Beirne. He served at St. Mary's from 1866-1877.

In June 1867, a house was purchased on High Street by Brennan and was converted into a rectory.  Plans were then made for a new church to be constructed at this location. The current church was constructed next door to the rectory Father Brennan established on High Street. While in Dedham he also had care of what is today St. Catherine's Church in Norwood, Massachusetts, which he improved during his pastorate.

During his pastorate in Dedham, the Sisters of Charity founded the St. Mary's School and Asylum at what was formerly the Norfolk House. At news of the sale, the Dedham Gazette wrote in an editorial:

Whatever prejudices may naturally exist against the establishment of a Roman Catholic School in so central a location, the community cannot but feel that the transformation of a building recently used only for the indiscriminate sale of liquors into an institution founded for 'promoting virtue, learning and piety in the town of Dedham' is an object worthy only of the most exalted motives, and in this view should be accepted as a public blessing.

The school held a number of fundraisers, but with the heavy debt of the parish the school closed on June 27, 1879.  The closure was intended to be temporary, but it never reopened. The building was sold in 1905.

It was a "somewhat pleasant surprise" when it was announced on January 14, 1877, that Brennan would be leaving St. Mary's and St. Catherine's and that the parish would be turned over to his curate, Dennis J. O'Donovan. Many in the congregation had been unhappy with Brennan and the week before he became the first priest to ever file for bankruptcy. The parish was also bankrupt at the time.

In the early 1880s he served at St. Mary's Church in Foxborough, Massachusetts. In 1883 he was serving in the Diocese of Springfield in Massachusetts.

References

Footnotes

Bibliography

 
 
 
 
 
 

College of the Holy Cross alumni
1889 deaths
American Roman Catholic priests
People from Indiana
Grand Séminaire de Montréal alumni
People from Taunton, Massachusetts
Clergy from Dedham, Massachusetts
People from Foxborough, Massachusetts
Year of birth uncertain